Serkan Özsoy  (born 3 August 1978 in Üsküdar) is a Turkish professional footballer who plays for TKİ Tavşanlı Linyitspor in the TFF First League.

Özsoy played previously for Fenerbahçe, Trabzonspor, Malatyaspor, Vestel Manisaspor, Gaziantepspor, Diyarbakırspor, Boluspor, Sakaryaspor, Kartalspor and Adana Demirspor.

References

1978 births
Living people
Turkish footballers
Fenerbahçe S.K. footballers
Malatyaspor footballers
Manisaspor footballers
Trabzonspor footballers
Gaziantepspor footballers
Diyarbakırspor footballers
Boluspor footballers
Sakaryaspor footballers
People from Üsküdar
Footballers from Istanbul
TFF First League players
Kahramanmaraşspor footballers
Turkey under-21 international footballers
Turkey youth international footballers

Association football defenders